The United Bank of Albania, formerly known as the Arab-Albanian Islamic Bank, is an Albanian bank that provides banking services with headquarters in Tirana.

History
The bank was founded by the state-owned National Commercial Bank of Albania (NCBA) and a group of Islamic investors. In 2000 NCBA was privatized and its 40% stake in UBA was acquired by the Ministry of Finance. In March 2009 the Ministry of Finance agreed to sell 40% of its shares to the Islamic Development Bank.

References

Banks of Albania